STATEC (officially in French: Institut national de la statistique et des études économiques) is the government statistics service of Luxembourg.  It is headquartered in the Kirchberg quarter of Luxembourg City.

Footnotes

External links
 Luxembourg Statistics Portal

Government of Luxembourg
Luxembourg
Organisations based in Luxembourg City